Ertij is a fort built during the 13th century. It is situated upon a hill adjacent to the village of Arpi in the Vayots Dzor Province of Armenia. Nearby in the gorge carved by the Arpa River is the cave shrine of Jrovank.

References

External links 
 Armeniapedia: Areni Church & Ertij Fort

Archaeological sites in Armenia
Castles in Armenia
Forts in Armenia
Tourist attractions in Vayots Dzor Province
Buildings and structures in Vayots Dzor Province